Cerace cyanopyga is a species of moth of the family Tortricidae. It is found in Burma.

The wingspan is about 44 mm. The forewings are black, but the middle third of the wings is crimson ferruginous from the base to before the termen. The markings are white. The hindwings are bright orange and the markings are black.

References

Moths described in 1950
Ceracini